Fabrice Omonga (born 6 February 1984) is a retired Belgian footballer of Congolese descent. He started his professional career with Brussels, enjoying over two seasons at the highest level of Belgian football, before moving to OH Leuven in the Belgian Second Division, first on loan, then permanently. Afterwards he moved to teams from lower divisions, including WS Woluwe and KRC Mechelen.

References

1984 births
Living people
Belgian footballers
Democratic Republic of the Congo emigrants to Belgium
Association football defenders
R. Charleroi S.C. players
R.A.A. Louviéroise players
R.W.D. Molenbeek players
R.S.C. Anderlecht players
Standard Liège players
R.W.D.M. Brussels F.C. players
Oud-Heverlee Leuven players
RWS Bruxelles players
K.R.C. Mechelen players
Belgian Pro League players
Challenger Pro League players